Ruprecht is both a surname and a masculine given name, a variant of Robert. People with the name include:

Surname:
Albert Rupprecht, German politician
David Ruprecht, American actor and writer
Franz Josef Ruprecht, Russian botanist
Tony Ruprecht, Canadian politician
William F. Ruprecht
Antal Ruprecht, Hungarian chemist

Given name:
Ruprecht, an alias assumed by fictional con man Freddie Benson, played by Marlon Brando in the 1964 film Bedtime Story and by Steve Martin in the 1988 remake, Dirty Rotten Scoundrels
Ruprecht von Eggenberg, Austrian colonel-general
Rupert of Germany (Ruprecht III), King of Germany 1400–1410
Ruprecht Polenz, German politician
Knecht Ruprecht, a legendary companion of St. Nicholas

German masculine given names
Surnames from given names